St. Vincent Street Church is a Presbyterian church on St. Vincent Street in Glasgow, Scotland. It was designed by Alexander Thomson (also known as "Greek" Thomson) and built from 1857 to 1859 for the former United Presbyterian Church of Scotland. Elements (probably the tower) are by Thomson's young assistant, the church architect Robert Gordon Wilson, who was a member of the UP church.

It is a Category A listed building. The church building is owned by Glasgow City Council, but is currently used by a congregation of the Free Church of Scotland: Glasgow City Free Church. In 1998 the building was listed in the 1998 World Monuments Watch by the World Monuments Fund, and again in 2004 and 2006. The Fund helped restore the tower, with support from American Express.

See also
 List of Category A listed buildings in Glasgow

References

External links

Photographs on the Glasgow Guide website
Website of Glasgow City Free Church
Alexander Thomson's Churches Internal and external photographs

Churches in Glasgow
Category A listed buildings in Glasgow
Listed churches in Glasgow
Churches completed in 1859
19th-century Presbyterian churches
Alexander Greek Thomson buildings
19th-century churches in the United Kingdom